U. japonica  may refer to:
 Umbraulva japonica, an alga species in the genus Umbraulva
 Urophora japonica, a fruit fly species

Synonyms
 Uvaria japonica, a synonym for Kadsura japonica, an ornamental plant species

See also
 Japonica (disambiguation)